I Love You Like You Are is an album by the American musician Ray Parker Jr., released in 1991. It includes the single "She Needs to Get Some".

Production
The album was produced by Parker Jr. It was recorded at Ameraycan Studios, in Los Angeles.

Critical reception

The Chicago Tribune wrote: "Opting to leave his guitar at home, Parker relies solely on synthesizers and drum machines to grind out one mildly arresting dance track ('Ain't Gone Go for That') and several interminable ballads." The Calgary Herald noted that "there's nothing here you haven't heard before, usually in a more interesting form."

Track listing

Personnel 
 Ray Parker Jr. – lead vocals, instruments (1-5, 7-11), backing vocals (8, 9, 10)
 Chris Pelcer – instruments (10)
 Gary Taylor – instruments (12), backing vocals (12)
 Aaron Smith – synthesizers (10)
 Cornelius Mims – bass (2)
 Damon Thomas – bass (2), instruments (6), synthesizers (7)
 Ollie E. Brown – percussion (2, 10)
 J.D. Nicholas – backing vocals (1-4, 7)
 Father MC – rap (1, 4), backing vocals (6)
 Rosalyn Keel – backing vocals (3, 5, 7, 11)
 Sidney Justin – backing vocals (3, 7)
 Sheldon Reynolds – backing vocals (3, 7)
 Karen Taylor – backing vocals (3, 5, 7, 11)
 Tricky Stewart – backing vocals (6)
 Angel Rogers – backing vocals (10)
 Terry Steele – backing vocals (10)
 Leon Ware – backing vocals (10)
 Cheri Wells – backing vocals (10)
 MC Mello – rap (11)

References

External links
 I Love You Like You Are at Discogs
 Official Website 
 Ray Parker Jr 2012 Audio Interview at Soulinterviews.com

Ray Parker Jr. albums
1991 albums
MCA Records albums
Albums produced by Ray Parker Jr.